The Royal Military Academy is the military university of Belgium. The institution is responsible for the education of the officers of the five components of the Belgian defence (Army, Air Force, Cyber, Navy, Medical) and is located in Brussels in a building constructed by the architects Henri Maquet and Henri Van Dievoet. The courses are given in French, Dutch and English.

The academy comprises two faculties:
The Faculty of Applied Sciences (Polytechnique, X): Master of Science in engineering sciences; comparable to the French École polytechnique (also nicknamed "X" and founded by one of its ex-students, Jean Chapelié)
The Faculty of Social and Military Sciences (S.M.S.): Master in Social and Military Sciences

The Royal Higher Institute for Defence, the highest military academic institute in Belgium is also located at the RMA campus (cf. Defence College, previously War College).

Admission
Admission to the university is only possible through public exams.

First, candidates have to pass military test common to all Belgian military categories (Medical, Endurance and physical tests, and a psychologic evaluation). After passing these, applying students have to compete with each other in public exams. These consist of mathematics and French & Dutch written language tests.
The university can only accommodate a certain number of students each year (rough estimate: 150/year) (strongly influenced by the need for officers of the Belgian military). Applying students have to compete with each other for these limited places.

Bologna
Since 2003, the academy made some changes to its faculties to conform with the Bologna Process.
Both degrees are now taught within a 5-year span. After the first three years, students receive a Bachelor Degree. The Master's degree can be attained in succeeding the following 2 years.
But in contrast to the common Bologna implementation, flexibility in attaining the degrees isn't greatly augmented. Student can only fail for one year within all five. Re-exams are however possible.
Student cannot take courses with them to the next year, they have to pass the re-exams. Before 2003 most courses were fixed, however, students had a limited choice between optional courses. 
A lot of flexibility regarding course choices was added by implementing course modules. 
Students can opt for certain modules which each hold specific and related courses.
For example: 
 Law module
 Psychology module
 Weapon systems module (ballistics)
 Management module
 Marine science module
 History module
 Communication & Information Systems module (Telecom, computer security, electricity).

The choice of course module is not always free, but is related with the chosen military speciality of the student (Infantry, Logistics, Transmission, Air traffic control, Artillery, Naval Forces,..) and often mandatory. The majority of the courses remains fixed in the Bachelor years. In the Masters years, the student follow more modules than fixed courses.

Nationalities

The vast majority of the students have the Belgian nationality, but cooperation with other countries has opened up the university to other nationalities. 
Many Luxemburgish officers receive their education in the university and have a long history in it.

More recently the university received military students from Canada, Lebanon, United States, Niger, the Democratic Republic of the Congo, Morocco, Tunisia and Rwanda, thanks to military cooperation, training and development programs. However, these students often belong to the social elite of their home country.
The foreign students, in contrast to the Belgian students, have no obligation to follow the Dutch language courses.

Notable alumni

Royal family 
The tradition of the royal princes to study at the academy is continuous.

Others

Notable faculty
 Jean Stas (1813–1891), chemistry
 Émile Janssens (1902–1989), history
 Oscar Michiels (1881–1946), military staffing

Affiliation
The Belgian Staff College was voted into the International Society of Military Sciences during the November 2011 meeting.

References

External links

 

 
Royal Military Academy
1834 establishments in Belgium
Educational institutions established in 1834
Military academies
Universities and colleges in Brussels
Organisations based in Belgium with royal patronage
Buildings by Henri Van Dievoet